Events from the year 1847 in the United States.

Incumbents

Federal Government 
 President: James K. Polk (D-Tennessee)
 Vice President: George M. Dallas (D-Pennsylvania)
 Chief Justice: Roger B. Taney (Maryland)
 Speaker of the House of Representatives: John Wesley Davis (D-Indiana) (until March 4), Robert Charles Winthrop (W-Massachusetts) (starting December 6)
 Congress: 29th (until March 4), 30th (starting March 4)

Events

January–March
 January 4 – Samuel Colt sells his first revolver pistol, the Colt Walker, to the U.S. government for the Texas Rangers.
 January 13 – The Treaty of Cahuenga ends the fighting in the Mexican–American War in California.
 January 16 – John C. Fremont is appointed Governor of the new California Territory.
 January 17 – Saint Anthony Hall is founded at Columbia University in New York City.
 January 30 – Yerba Buena, California is renamed San Francisco, California.
 February 5 – A rescue effort, called the First Relief, leaves Johnson's Ranch to save the ill-fated Donner Party. These California bound emigrants became snowbound in the Sierra Nevada in the winter of 1846–1847, and some have resorted to cannibalism to survive.
 February 22 – Mexican–American War – The Battle of Buena Vista: 5,000 American troops under General Zachary Taylor use their superiority in artillery to drive off 15,000 Mexican troops under Antonio López de Santa Anna, defeating the Mexicans the next day.
 March 1 – The state of Michigan formally abolishes the death penalty.
 March 9 – Mexican–American War: United States forces under General Winfield Scott invade Mexico near Veracruz in the first large-scale amphibious assault conducted by U.S. military forces.
 March 28 – The Massachusetts Donation of 1847 for Ireland sails from Boston on USS Jamestown.
 March 29 – Mexican–American War: United States forces led by General Winfield Scott take Veracruz after a siege.

April–June
 May 7 – The American Medical Association (AMA) is founded in Philadelphia.
 June 1 – Zeta Psi fraternity of North America is founded at New York University.
 June 10 – The Chicago Tribune begins publication.

July–September
 July 1 – The United States issues its first postage stamps, featuring George Washington and Benjamin Franklin.
 July 24 – After 17 months of travel, Brigham Young leads 148 Mormon pioneers into Salt Lake Valley, resulting in the establishment of Salt Lake City.
 July 29 – The Cumberland School of Law is founded at Cumberland University in Lebanon, Tennessee. At the end of 1847 only 15 law schools exist in the United States.
 August 12 – U.S. troops of General Winfield Scott begin to advance along the aqueduct around Lake Chalco and Lake Xochimilco in Mexico
 August 20 – U.S. troops defeat Mexican troops in Valencia, Mexico

October–December
 October 31 – Theta Delta Chi is founded as a social fraternity at Union College, Schenectady, New York.
 November 29 – The Whitman massacre: Oregon missionaries Dr. Marcus Whitman, his wife Narcissa, and eleven others are killed in the Oregon Country by Cayuse and Umatilla Indians, starting the Cayuse War.

Undated
 The North Carolina General Assembly incorporates the railroad town of Goldsborough, and the Wayne county seat is moved to the new town.
 The candy Necco Wafers are first produced as "hub wafers" in New England, an origin of the candy industry.
 Hardware business Orgill is established in Memphis, Tennessee.

Ongoing
 Mexican–American War (1846–1848)

Births
 January 11 
 Alpheus Michael Bowman, politician and businessman (died 1913)
 Marion McKinley Bovard, academic administrator, 1st President of the University of Southern California (died 1891)
 January 16 – John Cutting Berry, physician and missionary (died 1936)
 January 23 – Elijah Bond, lawyer and inventor (died 1921)
 January 28 – William V. Allen, United States Senator from Nebraska from 1893 till 1899.  (died 1924)
 February 2 – Charles H. Baker,  politician (died 1919)
 February 11 – Thomas Edison, American inventor and businessman (died 1931)
 February 26 – William A. B. Branch, politician (died 1910)
 March 2 – Blanche Butler Ames, First Lady of Mississippi (d. 1939)
 March 13 – Francis S. White, United States Senator from Alabama from 1914 till 1915. (died 1922)
 March 18 – William O'Connell Bradley, United States Senator from Kentucky from 1895 till 1899. (died 1914)
 March 21 – Oscar Bielaski, Major League Baseball player (died 1911)
 March 27 – Warren Ives Bradley, children's author (died 1868)
 March 29 – John D. Works, United States Senator from California from 1911 till 1917. (died 1928)
 April 13 – J. Thompson Baker, politician from New Jersey (died 1919)
 May 25 – John Green Brady, 5th Governor of the District of Alaska from 1897 till 1906 (d. 1918)
 June 8 – Ida Saxton McKinley, First Lady of the United States, (died 1907)
 June 26 – Daniel V. Asay, iceboat racer (died 1930)
 June 29 – Brother Azarias, educator (d. 1893)
 July 4 – James Anthony Bailey, circus ringmaster (d. 1906)
 July 19 – Oliver Ernesto Branch, politician (d. 1916)
 August 12 – William Rankin Ballard, businessman (d. 1929)
 September 5 – Jesse James, American outlaw, guerrilla, gang leader, bank robber, train robber, and murderer from Missouri. (died 1882)
 September 10 – Franklin Bartlett, politician (died 1909)
 September 11 – Mary Watson Whitney, American astronomer and academic (died 1921)
 September 23 – Victoria Woodhull, American leader of the woman's suffrage movement (died 1927)
 September 30 – James Taliaferro, United States Senator from Florida from 1899 till 1911. (died 1934)
 October 18 – Emma Elizabeth Brown, author and artist (unknown year of death)
 October 23 – Gottfried Blocklinger, admiral (died 1930)
 October 31 – Wendell P. Bowman, army major general (died 1928)
 November 7 – Melvin O. Adams, attorney and railroad executive (died 1920)
 November 10 – Frederick Arthur Bridgman,  artist (died 1928)
 November 23 – Joseph Ackroyd, politician, member of the New York State Senate (died 1915)
 December 21 – Fletcher S. Bassett, founder of the Chicago Folk-Lore Society (died 1893)
 December 30 – John Peter Altgeld, 20th governor of Illinois (died 1902)
 December 31 – Wilson S. Bissell, politician, United States Postmaster General (died 1903)

Deaths
 January 19 – Charles Bent, first civilian governor of the New Mexico territory (born 1799)
 January 30 – Virginia Eliza Clemm Poe, wife of Edgar Allan Poe (born 1822)
 May 1 – Jesse Speight, United States Senator from Mississippi from 1845 till 1847. (born 1795)
 July 22 – Henry W. Edwards, United States Senator from Connecticut from 1823 till 1838. (born 1779)
 August 6 – Henry M. Ridgely, United States Senator from Delaware from 1827 till 1829. (born 1779)
 November 1 – Jabez W. Huntington, United States Senator from Connecticut from 1840 till 1847. (born 1788)
 November 29 – Narcissa Whitman, pioneer missionary (born 1808)

See also
Timeline of United States history (1820–1859)

References

External links
 

 
1840s in the United States
United States
United States
Years of the 19th century in the United States